This is a list of islands in the Greater Manila Area in the Philippines.

There are several small islands located within the Greater Manila Area, particularly along the coast of Manila Bay, both natural and artificial. Many of these islands were formed by the Pasig River delta and consist of sand and mudflats. Artificial islands have been built particularly in Tondo's North Port area, the Navotas fish port area, and the Las Piñas–Parañaque reclamation area.

Historically, the City of Manila consisted of small islands formed by rivulets called esteros. They include Binondo, formed by the Estero de Binondo and Estero de la Reina, and San Miguel, formed by the Estero de San Miguel and Estero de Sampaloc. The walled district of Intramuros was itself an island surrounded by moats during the Spanish colonial period. Many of these waterways have been filled i  over the years due to urbanization.

Near the entrance to Manila Bay is a group of islands, the largest of which is Corregidor. Although administered as part of the province of Cavite, these islands are linked historically to Manila, serving as part of the city's defense system through much of the Spanish and American colonial eras.

List of islands

Metro Manila

City of Manila
 Engineer's Island
A 25-30-hectare artificial island which contains Baseco Compound, an urban poor community separated from the Manila South Harbor by a narrow channel at the mouth of the Pasig River.
 Isla de Balút
An artificial island in the Manila North Harbor in Tondo bounded on the north by Estero de Sunog Apog (Estero de Marela), on the south and east by Estero de Vitas, and Manila Bay on the west.
 Isla de Convalecencia
The only ait dividing the Pasig River in the City of Manila, located in San Miguel District.
 Isla de Provisor
A small island in northwestern Paco District surrounded by Estero de Provisor, Estero del Tanque, and the Pasig River.
Malabon - Navotas
 Isla Pulo
An island sitio north of the main island of Navotas.
 Dampalit Island
 An island barangay and one of the six original islands on which Malabon was founded. It is separated from the mainland on the east by the Muzon River, the Batasan River on the north, and from Navotas on the west by the Dampalit River.
 Malabón Island
 Malabon city proper is on one of the six islands which originally comprised Malabon. It is bounded on the north by Dampalit River, on the east and south by Tullahan River and on the west by the Navotas and Tanza rivers which separate it from Navotas.
Maysilo Island
An island barangay and one of six islands of Malabón, in the mangrove swamps north of Manila.
 Navotas Fish Port Complex
An artificial island immediately to the north of Isla de Balút, separated from the main island of Navotas on the north by the Bangkulasi Channel and Tullahan River, on the east from Caloocan by the Navotas River, and on the south by Estero de Sunog Apog (Estero de Marela).
 Navotas Island
Navotas city proper is situated on an elongated coastal island, its length on a northwest-southeast axis. It is separated from Malabon by the Malabón-Navotas River.
 Tanza Island
An island barangay in Navotas surrounded by the Tangos, Batasan, and Tanza rivers.
Las Piñas - Parañaque
 Long Island
One of three artificial islands that form the Las Piñas–Parañaque Critical Habitat and Ecotourism Area.
 Freedom Island
One of three artificial islands that form the Las Piñas–Parañaque Critical Habitat and Ecotourism Area.

Manila Bay Islands

 Caballo Island
 Carabao Island
 Corregidor Island
 El Fraile Island
 La Monja Island
 Limbones Island
 Los Cochinos Islands

Central Luzon

 Binuangan Island
 Camara Island
 Capones Island
 Egg Islands
 Hermana Mayor Island
 Hermana Menor Island
 Los Frailes Islands
 Magalawa Island
 Matalvi Island
 Pamana (Pequeña) Island
 Pampanga River Delta Islands
 Panatag Shoal or Scarborough Shoal (also claimed by China and Taiwan)
 Potipot Island
 Salvador Island
 Silanguin Island
 Subic Chiquita Island
 Subic Grande Island
 Tabones Island

Calabarzon

 Alabat Island
 Alibijaban Island
 Anilon Island
 Apat Island
 Bakaw-Bakaw Island
 Balot Island
 Baluti Island
 Binombonan Island
 Bird Island
 Bonga Island
 Bonito Island
 Bubuin Island
 Burunggoy Island
 Caban Island
 Cagbalete Island
 Calamba Island
 Culebra Island
 Dalig Island
 Dampalitan Island
 Fortune Island
 Ikulong Island
 Isla Puting Bato Island
 Lagdauin Island
 Lambauing Island
 Ligpo Island
 Malahi Island
 Malajibomanoc Island
 Mangayao Island
 Manlanat Island
 Maricaban Island
 Napayong Island
 Pagbilao Chica Island
 Pagbilao Grande Island
 Palasan Island
 Patayan Island
 Santa Amalia Island
 Sombrero Island
 Talabaan Islands
 Talim Island
 Twin Island
 Verde Island
 Volcano Island

See also
 Geography of Manila
 List of islands of the Philippines

References

 
Manila area
Islands